Qazi-ye Bala (also Romanized as Qāzī-ye Bālā and Qāzī Bālā; also known as Qāẕī-ye ‘Olyā and Qāzī-ye ‘Olyā) is a village in Rahjerd-e Sharqi Rural District, Salafchegan District, Qom County, Qom Province, Iran. At the 2006 census, its population was 95, in 28 families.

References 

Populated places in Qom Province